Galium corsicum, the Corsican bedstraw, is a plant species in the Rubiaceae. It is native to the islands of Corsica and Sardinia in the Mediterranean.

References

External links
Sardegna Digital Library, Galium corsicum
Sardegna Flora, Galium corsicum

carmineum
Flora of Italy
Flora of Corsica
Flora of France
Flora of Sardinia
Plants described in 1827